John B. Cox is a British-born ornithologist, who emigrated to Australia in 1968.

The hybrid shorebird Cox's sandpiper was named after him by Shane Parker.

References

Cox, John B.
Cox, John
British emigrants to Australia
Year of birth missing (living people)